The following is a timeline of the COVID-19 pandemic in Argentina.

Summary

Timeline

February 2020
On February 4, the cruise ship Diamond Princess was quarantined in the Port of Yokohama in Japan when 10 passengers were diagnosed with COVID-19 during the early stages of the COVID-19 pandemic. Among the passengers diagnosed positive was the first Argentine infected, a 61-year-old man travelling with his wife, who had no symptoms. The patient was transferred to a hospital in Japan "for studies and treatment". The other seven Argentines on board, including his wife, remained on the cruise in quarantine until February 21. The man was in perfect health and was released on February 17. He finally left Japan on February 24 and arrived in Argentina on February 26, moving to his home in the city of Buenos Aires.

March 2020
 3 March: A first case of the COVID-19 was confirmed in Buenos Aires in a 43-year-old man who had arrived on 1 March from Milan, Italy.
 5 March: A second case was later confirmed in a 23-year-old man living in Buenos Aires, who had recently returned from Northern Italy.
 6 March: An Italian tourist, a 25-year-old local man who arrived from Madrid, a 60-year-old woman who had arrived from Italy and a Japanese citizen were confirmed to have the virus, bringing the total cases to eight.
 7 March: The country's first death from coronavirus, a 64-year-old man who had travelled to Paris who also had other health conditions, was confirmed on this day, and the case was only confirmed as positive after the patient's demise. The person was not among the eight already diagnosed with the disease and was diagnosed post-mortem.
 8 March: On this day, a 53-year-old local woman who arrived from Europe, a 71-year-old Italian citizen who arrived from Parma, and another person who had recently returned from the United States were confirmed to have the virus, bringing the total cases to 12.
 9 March: The Ministry of Health confirmed five new cases, in Buenos Aires, San Luis, Chaco (2), and Río Negro, bringing the total to 17.
 10 March: The Ministry of Health confirmed two new cases, in La Matanza and Buenos Aires, a 42-year-old man who returned from Spain and a 23-year-old man who arrived from France, respectively, bringing the total cases to 19.

 11 March: Two new cases were confirmed, a 54-year-old man from Buenos Aires who had returned from Germany and a 48-year-old woman from Buenos Aires Province who had recently returned from Spain, bringing the total cases to 21. The government also announced a mandatory 14-day-quarantine to every person that returned to Argentina from highly affected countries including China, South Korea, Japan, Iran, the United States and all of Europe.
 12 March: Ten new cases were confirmed (three are from local transmission) in Buenos Aires and the provinces of Buenos Aires, Chaco, and Córdoba, bringing the total cases to 31. In Chaco, the first native transmission was confirmed. Also, the first patient with the virus in the country was discharged and left hospital in Buenos Aires the next day.
 13 March: The second death in the country linked to the virus was confirmed, a 61-year-old man from Chaco Province with other underlying health conditions who had travelled to Egypt, Turkey, and Germany. Later that same day three new cases were confirmed, bringing the total to 34.
 14 March: The Ministry of Health confirmed eleven new cases in Buenos Aires and the provinces of Buenos Aires, Chaco, and Santa Fe, bringing the total to 45.
 15 March: The Ministry of Health confirmed eleven new cases: 6 in Buenos Aires, 2 in Chaco, 2 in Tierra del Fuego (first cases), and one in Buenos Aires Province. One of the cases in Chaco, the first announced this day, was of a 64-year-old woman who contracted the virus through casual contact. The government also announced the closure of their borders to non-residents, closure of national parks, and the suspension of public and private school classes.
 16 March: Nine new cases were confirmed by the national Ministry of Health in the City of Buenos Aires (5) and the provinces of Chaco (3) and Buenos Aires (1), bringing the total to 65. Soon after in the night, the Governor of Chaco confirmed the provincial number of four more cases instead of three, bringing the total to 66. Tierra del Fuego was put on lockdown later that day, becoming the first province to do so.
 17 March: The Ministry of Health confirmed fourteen new cases in the City of Buenos Aires (4), Buenos Aires Province (2), Córdoba (2), Chaco (1), Jujuy (1), Río Negro (1), Salta (1), Entre Ríos (1), and Santa Cruz (1), bringing the total to 79.
 18 March: 19 new cases were confirmed in the City of Buenos Aires (10), Buenos Aires Province (6), Chaco (1), Córdoba (1), and Entre Ríos (1), and one case of the 14 reported the day before was reclassified, bringing the total to 97. After the report from the Ministry of Health, it became known the third death from the virus. The provinces of Chaco, Misiones, Salta, Jujuy, Mendoza and Tierra del Fuego closed their borders.

 19 March: The Ministry of Health confirmed 31 new cases in the City of Buenos Aires (8), Buenos Aires Province (15), Córdoba (3), Chaco (2), Tucumán (1), Santa Fe (1), and Río Negro (1), bringing the total to 128. In the night, President Alberto Fernández announced a mandatory lockdown, in effect from midnight on 20 March until 31 March.
 20 March: The Ministry of Health confirmed 30 new cases in the City of Buenos Aires (9) and the provinces of Buenos Aires (9), Córdoba (4), Neuquén (2), Chaco, Tierra del Fuego, Entre Ríos, San Luis, Corrientes, and Santiago del Estero (one each). The number of confirmed cases had risen to 158.
 21 March: Another death was reported from the Province of Buenos Aires, bringing the total number of deaths in the country to four. Later, the Ministry of Health confirmed 67 new cases in the City of Buenos Aires (29) and the provinces of Buenos Aires (15), Chaco (5), Mendoza (5), Córdoba (4), Tierra del Fuego (3), Corrientes (2), Santa Fe (2), Tucumán (1), and Río Negro (1), bringing the total to 225.
 22 March: The Ministry of Health confirmed 41 new cases in the City of Buenos Aires (12), and the provinces of Buenos Aires (8), Córdoba (8), Chaco (7), Tucumán (5), and Misiones (1). The number of confirmed cases has risen to 266. After the national report, the Government of Misiones denied having a case in the province, and said the case belonged to the Province of Córdoba, and the Province of Santiago del Estero announced its second confirmed case.
 23 March: Ministry of Health officials reported the coronavirus is spreading via "community transmission" in the City of Buenos Aires, its surroundings and some cities in Chaco, Tierra del Fuego and Córdoba provinces. Also reported 51 recoveries. Later in the daily report, the Ministry of Health confirmed 36 new cases in the City of Buenos Aires (11) and the provinces of Buenos Aires (5), Córdoba (3), Santa Fe (13) and Chaco (4). The number of confirmed cases has risen to 301. In the Province of Santa Fe, five inmates died during riots in two jails, amid tensions over coronavirus.
 24 March: In the morning, the Ministry of Health confirmed a total of 52 recoveries. The fifth death was reported, a 71-year-old man who had returned from Spain and was hospitalised in Mar del Plata, and then a sixth death was reported in Chaco, a 53-year-old man without comorbidities. Later, 86 new cases were confirmed with 30 being in the City of Buenos Aires, 30 in Buenos Aires Province, 9 in Chaco, 7 in Córdoba, 4 in Tierra del Fuego, 3 in Santa Fe and 1 in Neuquén, La Pampa, and Santa Cruz, bringing the total to 387.
 25 March: In the morning, the Ministry of Health confirmed a total of 63 recoveries. Later new deaths were reported, two women hospitalized in the City of Buenos Aires and Chaco, bringing the death toll to eight. The Ministry of Health confirmed 117 new cases of which 21 belong to the City of Buenos Aires, 30 to Buenos Aires Province, 22 to Santa Fe, 15 to Córdoba, 12 to Chaco, 5 to Santa Cruz, 4 to San Luis, 3 to Entre Ríos, 2 to Tucumán and one each in the provinces of Mendoza, Neuquén and Tierra del Fuego. The number of confirmed cases has risen to 502.
 26 March: In the morning, the Ministry of Health confirmed a total of 72 recoveries. The ninth death (and fourth in Chaco) was reported, a 59-year-old man who died the previous day and was diagnosed post-mortem. Later, 87 new cases were confirmed with 30 in the City of Buenos Aires and 27 in Buenos Aires Province, 12 in Santa Fe, 3 in Chaco, 3 in Córdoba, 3 in Neuquén, 3 in Tierra del Fuego, 2 in Jujuy, 2 in Santa Cruz, 1 in Mendoza and the other one in San Luis, raising the number of confirmed cases to 589. Also, four new deaths were reported, compared to the previous day report, raising the number of confirmed deaths to 12.
 27 March: In the morning, the Ministry of Health confirmed a total of 76 recoveries. The death of a 59-year-old traumatologist who had travelled to Europe in Neuquén brought the country's death toll to thirteen. In the night report, the Ministry of health raised the number of deaths to seventeen, with 101 new and reclassified cases in the City of Buenos Aires (43) and the provinces of Buenos Aires (36), Santa Fe (9), Tucumán (6), Córdoba (5), Neuquén (4), Chaco (3), Entre Ríos (3), Río Negro (3), Corrientes (2), Mendoza (1), Santiago del Estero (1), and Misiones (1).
 28 March: A new death was confirmed, a 51-year-old man from Mar del Plata that returned from a trip to Spain and Egypt. The man was diagnosed a week ago and was in the ICU under mechanical ventilation, but did not register any previous condition. Later the Ministry of Health confirmed 55 new cases, in the City of Buenos Aires (18) and the provinces of Santa Fe (13), Buenos Aires (8), Chaco (5), Corrientes (4), Tierra del Fuego (4), Neuquén (2), Mendoza (1), and Córdoba (1). Also, another death was registered of an 84-year-old woman from the City of Buenos Aires that had contact with a person that travelled to Italy. Therefore, the number of cases rose to 745 and 19 fatal victims.
 29 March: 75 new cases were confirmed by the Ministry of Health on the City of Buenos Aires (13) and the provinces of Córdoba (18), Buenos Aires (16), Santa Fe (13), Chaco (4), Tierra del Fuego (4), La Pampa (2), San Juan (1), La Rioja (1), Mendoza (1), Misiones (1) and Corrientes (1). Two new deaths were confirmed, one from a 58-year-old man from the Province of Buenos Aires that had contact with another confirmed case and had a history of COPD, and a 50-year-old man from Tucumán that recently returned from Europe with his wife that was the first case on the province. To this day there were 820 confirmed cases and 21 deaths. Later, president Fernández announced that the mandatory lockdown would be extended until April 12.
 30 March: Four new deaths were confirmed, two men from the Province of Buenos Aires (58 and 67 years old), a 68-year-old woman from Neuquén that returned from Spain and another 77-year-old woman from Tucumán that suffered from obesity, diabetes and hypertension and have travelled to Chile and Bolivia. 146 new cases were confirmed in the Province of Buenos Aires (36), the City of Buenos Aires (34), Santa Fe (21), Chaco (12), Tierra del Fuego (11), Corrientes (10), Córdoba (8), Neuquén (8), Mendoza (3) y Entre Ríos (3), bringing the total to 966 accumulated cases and 24 deaths.
 31 March: The Ministry of Health confirmed 88 new cases in Santa Fe (22), the City of Buenos Aires (19), the Province of Buenos Aires (17), Córdoba (14), Tierra del Fuego (7), Chaco (3), Mendoza (2), Río Negro (1), Corrientes (1), Misiones (1), and Tucumán (1). Three new deaths were also confirmed, three women from Chaco (63 years old), La Rioja (52) and Córdoba (89). The number of cases now rose to 1,054 and 27 fatal victims.

April 2020
 1 April: The Ministry of Health confirmed 79 new cases in Chaco (12), Santa Fe (11), the City of Buenos Aires (10), Santa Cruz (10), the Province of Buenos Aires (10), Mendoza (10), Córdoba (6), Neuquén (4), Salta (2), Entre Ríos (1), Corrientes (1), San Luis (1), and Tucumán (1). Six new deaths were confirmed, a 71-year-old man from the Province of Buenos Aires, the 66-year-old Chilean consul in Santa Fe, a 55-year-old rabbi from the City of Buenos Aires, a 78-year-old man from Neuquén, a 73-year old from Mendoza, and a 61-year-old woman from the Province of Buenos Aires. The number of cases are 1,133 and the death toll has risen to 33.
 2 April: 132 new cases were confirmed in the City of Buenos Aires (24) and the provinces of Buenos Aires (36), Tierra del Fuego (24), Córdoba (16), Santa Fe (8), Neuquén (4), Tucumán (4), Chaco (3), La Rioja (3), San Luis (2), Jujuy (2), Entre Ríos (2), Santa Cruz (2), Santiago del Estero (1) and Corrientes (1). Also, four new deaths were registered (a 73-year-old man from Mendoza, a 61-year-old from Chaco and a 41-year-old from the Province of Buenos Aires), bringing the death toll to 37 and the number of total confirmed cases to 1,265.
 3 April: 88 new cases were confirmed, from the City of Buenos Aires (28), and the provinces of Buenos Aires (22), Córdoba (14), Santa Fe (8), Chaco (8), Entre Ríos (2), Mendoza (2), Neuquén (1), Río Negro (1), San Luis (1) and Tierra del Fuego (1). Five new deaths were registered: two men from the Province of Buenos Aires (87 and 72 years old), a 60-year-old man from Chaco, a 76-year-old man of Spanish nationality living in Mendoza, and a 53-year-old woman from the Province of Buenos Aires. There are 1353 confirmed cases and 42 fatal victims to this day.
 4 April: The Ministry of Health announced that 98 new cases were registered, from the City of Buenos Aires (34) and the Provinces of Buenos Aires (26), Chaco (8), Tierra del Fuego (8), Río Negro (5), Santa Fe (5), Neuquén (4), Córdoba (3), La Rioja (2), Santa Cruz (1), Santiago del Estero (1) and Tucumán (1). A 73-year-old man from the Province of Buenos Aires died, bringing the number of deaths to 43.
 5 April: On this day, 103 new cases were confirmed and the death toll rose to 48 fatal victims (two of them died after the Ministry of Health's nightly official report).
 6 April: The Ministry of Health announced that 74 new cases were confirmed in the last 24 hours, bringing the number of total confirmed cases to 1,628. Five new deaths were reported, three men from the City of Buenos Aires, a man from the Province of Buenos Aires, and another man from Neuquén, making the number of deaths rise to 53. Also, it was reported that 325 people were discharged to this day.
 7 April: 87 new cases and seven new deaths were reported, bringing the total number of cases to 1,715 and the number of deaths to 60.
 8 April: President Fernández announced that the mandatory lockdown would be extended beyond 12 April, with "flexibilisation" of few activities only. Later, the Ministry of Health confirmed 80 new cases and five new deaths; The number of confirmed cases has risen to 1,795 and the number of total deaths to 65, while the number of recoveries is now 358.
 9 April: The Ministry of Health announced that 99 new cases were confirmed in the last 24 hours, bringing the number of total confirmed cases to 1,894. 14 new deaths were reported, making the number of deaths rise to 79, and the number of recoveries has risen to 365.
 10 April: 81 new cases and three new deaths were reported, bringing the total number of cases to 1,975 and the number of deaths to 82. In the night, President Fernández confirmed that the lockdown would be extended until 26 April in major cities, and that the flexibilisation of restrictions in zones with lesser risk would be analysed.
 11 April: On this day, 162 new cases were confirmed by the Ministry of Health in the Argentinian territory, the highest to this date, and the death toll rose to 89 fatal victims.
 12 April: The Ministry of Health announced that 66 new cases were confirmed in the last 24 hours, bringing the number of total confirmed cases to 2,203. Five new deaths were reported, making the number of deaths rise to 94, and the number of recoveries has risen to 467.
 13 April: The Ministry of Health confirmed 69 new cases and three new deaths; The number of confirmed cases has risen to 2,272 and the number of total deaths to 98, while the number of recoveries is now 514. After appearance of three asymptomatic cases, Buenos Aires authorities introduced compulsory masking starting on April 14. Wearing a face mask was made obligatory for everyone on public transit and everyone who contacts with the public in their position. Violators can face a fine. Authorities also prohibited the sale of N95 masks to non-medical workers, suggesting the general public to use home-made masks instead.

 14 April: 160 new cases and seven new deaths were reported, bringing the total number of cases to 2,432 and the number of deaths to 105.
 15 April: The Ministry of Health announced that 128 new cases were confirmed in the last 24 hours, bringing the number of total confirmed cases to 2,560. Seven new deaths were reported, making the number of deaths rise to 112, and the number of recoveries has risen to 595.
 16 April: On this day, 98 new cases and 10 deaths were confirmed by the Ministry of Health, bringing the number of total confirmed cases to 2,658  and the death toll to 122 fatal victims.
 17 April: 89 new cases and seven new deaths were reported, bringing the total number of cases to 2,747 and the number of deaths to 129.
 18 April: The Ministry of Health confirmed 81 new cases and three new deaths; The number of confirmed cases has risen to 2,828 and the number of total deaths to 132, while the number of recoveries is now 684.
 19 April: The Ministry of Health announced that 102 new cases were confirmed in the last 24 hours, bringing the number of total confirmed cases to 2,930. Two new deaths were reported, making the number of deaths rise to 134, and also 24 patients were discharged, bringing the total number of recoveries to 708.
 20 April: On this day, 90 new cases and eight deaths were confirmed by the Ministry of Health, bringing the number of total confirmed cases to 3,020  and the death toll to 142 fatal victims.
 21 April: 113 new cases and nine new deaths were reported, bringing the total number of cases to 3,133 and the number of deaths to 151.
 22 April: The Ministry of Health confirmed 143 new cases and eight new deaths; The number of confirmed cases has risen to 3,276 and the number of total deaths to 159, while the number of recoveries is now 868.
 23 April: The Ministry of Health announced that 147 new cases were confirmed in the last 24 hours, bringing the number of total confirmed cases to 3,423. Six new deaths were reported, making the number of deaths rise to 165, and also 40 patients were discharged, bringing the total number of recoveries to 908.
 24 April: The daily report of the Ministry of Health confirmed 172 new cases, the highest to this date, bringing the total number of cases to 3,595. 11 new deaths were also reported, making the number of total deaths rise to 176. Meanwhile, 965 recoveries were confirmed to this day.
 25 April: On this day, 172 new cases, 54 recoveries and nine new deaths were confirmed, making the number of total cases rise to 3,767, the number of deaths to 185 and the number of recoveries to 1,019. Also, president Fernández announced that a third phase of the lockdown would take place, extending it to major cities until 10 May.
 26 April: In the morning, the Ministry of Health confirmed a total of 77 recoveries. In the night report, seven deaths and 112 new cases were confirmed, bringing the total number of deaths to 192 and confirmed cases to 3,879.
 27 April: 111 new cases and five new deaths were reported, bringing the total number of cases to 3,990 and the number of deaths to 197.
 28 April: The Ministry of Health confirmed 124 new cases and 10 new deaths; The number of confirmed cases has risen to 4,114 and the number of total deaths to 207, while the number of recoveries is now 1,151.
 29 April: The Ministry of Health announced that 158 new cases were confirmed in the last 24 hours, bringing the number of total confirmed cases to 4,272. Seven new deaths were reported, making the number of deaths rise to 214, and also 30 patients were discharged, bringing the total number of recoveries to 1,181.
 30 April: The daily report of the Ministry of Health confirmed 143 new cases, bringing the total number of cases to 4,415. Four new deaths were also reported, making the number of total deaths rise to 218. Meanwhile, 1,245 recoveries were confirmed to this day.

May 2020
 1 May: On this day, 105 new cases, 34 recoveries and seven new deaths were confirmed, making the number of total cases rise to 4,519, the number of deaths to 225 and the number of recoveries to 1,279.
 2 May: In the morning, the Ministry of Health confirmed a total of 28 new recoveries. In the night report, 12 deaths and 149 new cases were confirmed, bringing the total number of deaths to 237 and confirmed cases to 4,668.
 3 May: 103 new cases and nine deaths were confirmed on this day, making the number of total cases rise to 4,770 and the death toll to 246 deaths.
 4 May: The number of confirmed cases rose to 4,874. 14 new deaths were also reported, bringing the number of deaths to 260.
 5 May: The Ministry of Health announced that 134 new cases were confirmed in the last 24 hours, bringing the number of total confirmed cases to 5,007. Four new deaths were reported, making the number of deaths rise to 264, and also 30 patients were discharged, bringing the total number of recoveries to 1,459.
 6 May: The Ministry of Health confirmed 188 new cases and nine new deaths; The number of confirmed cases has risen to 5,195 and the number of total deaths to 273, while the number of recoveries is now 1,511.
 7 May: The daily report of the Ministry of Health confirmed 163 new cases, bringing the total number of cases to 5,358. Nine new deaths were also reported, making the number of total deaths rise to 282. Meanwhile, 1,588 recoveries were confirmed to this day.
 8 May: On this day, 58 recoveries and 11 new deaths were confirmed, making the number of total of recoveries rise to 1,646 and the number of deaths to 293. Also, 240 new confirmed cases were confirmed, setting a new record high for the country, bringing the total number of confirmed cases up to 5,598. President Fernández announced that the national lockdown would be "relaxed" throughout the country with the exception of Greater Buenos Aires, where the lockdown was extended until 24 May.

 9 May: In the morning, the Ministry of Health confirmed a total of 69 new recoveries. In the night report, seven deaths and 165 new cases were confirmed, bringing the total number of deaths to 300 and confirmed cases to 5,763.
 10 May: 258 new cases and five deaths were confirmed on this day, making the number of total cases rise to 6,021 and the death toll to 305 deaths.
 11 May: The Ministry of Health announced that 244 new cases were confirmed in the last 24 hours, bringing the number of total confirmed cases to 6,265. Nine new deaths were reported, making the number of deaths rise to 314, and also 80 patients were discharged, bringing the total number of recoveries to 1,824.
 12 May: There were 285 new confirmed cases, rising to a total of 6,550. Five new deaths were also reported, bringing the number of deaths to 319.
 13 May: The Ministry of Health confirmed 316 new cases and 10 new deaths; The number of confirmed cases has risen to 6,866 and the number of total deaths to 329, while the number of recoveries is now 2,253.
 14 May: On this day, 119 recoveries and 24 new deaths were confirmed, making the number of total of recoveries rise to 2,372 and the number of deaths to 353. Also, 255 new confirmed cases were confirmed, bringing the total number of confirmed cases up to 7,121.
 15 May: In the morning, the Ministry of Health confirmed a total of 112 new recoveries. In the night report, three deaths and 345 new cases were confirmed, bringing the total number of deaths to 356 and confirmed cases to 7,466.
 16 May: 326 new cases and seven deaths were confirmed on this day, making the number of total cases rise to 7,792 and the death toll to 363 deaths.
 17 May: The Ministry of Health confirmed 263 new cases and 10 new deaths; The number of confirmed cases has risen to 8,055 and the number of total deaths to 373, while the number of recoveries is now 2,556.
 18 May: The Ministry of Health announced that 303 new cases were confirmed in the last 24 hours, bringing the number of total confirmed cases to 8,358. Nine new deaths were reported, making the number of deaths rise to 382, and also 56 patients were discharged, bringing the total number of recoveries to 2,612.
 19 May: There were 438 new confirmed cases, rising to a total of 8,796. 11 new deaths were also reported, bringing the number of deaths to 393.
 20 May: On this day, 61 recoveries and 10 new deaths were confirmed, making the number of total of recoveries rise to 2,920 and the number of deaths to 403. Also, 474 new confirmed cases were confirmed, bringing the total number of confirmed cases up to 9,270.
 21 May: 474 new cases and 13 deaths were confirmed on this day, making the number of total cases rise to 9,918 and the death toll to 416 deaths.
 22 May: The number of confirmed cases rose to a total of 10,636 after 718 new cases were reported. 17 new deaths were also reported, bringing the number of deaths to 433.
 23 May: In the morning, the Ministry of Health confirmed a total of 468 new recoveries. In the night report, 12 deaths and 704 new cases were confirmed, bringing the total number of deaths to 445 and confirmed cases to 11,340. Also, President Fernández confirmed that the lockdown in Greater Buenos Aires would be extended until 7 June due to a big increase in the number of new cases in the previous days.
 24 May: The Ministry of Health confirmed 723 new cases and seven new deaths; The number of confirmed cases has risen to 12,063 and the number of total deaths to 452, while the number of recoveries is now 3,719.
 25 May: The Ministry of Health announced that 552 new cases were confirmed in the last 24 hours, bringing the number of total confirmed cases to 12,615. 15 new deaths were reported, making the number of deaths rise to 467, and also 267 patients were discharged, bringing the total number of recoveries to 3,986.
 26 May: There were 600 new confirmed cases, rising to a total of 13,215. 23 new deaths were also reported, bringing the number of deaths to 490.
 27 May: 705 new cases and 10 deaths were confirmed on this day, making the number of total cases rise to 13,920 and the death toll to 500 deaths.
 28 May: On this day, 268 recoveries and eight new deaths were confirmed, making the number of total of recoveries rise to 4,604 and the number of deaths to 508. Also, 769 new confirmed cases were confirmed, bringing the total number of confirmed cases up to 14,689.
 29 May: The number of confirmed cases rose to a total of 15,406 after 717 new cases were reported. 12 new deaths were also reported, bringing the number of deaths to 520.
 30 May: In the morning, the Ministry of Health confirmed a total of 312 new recoveries. In the night report, eight deaths and 795 new cases were confirmed, bringing the total number of deaths to 528 and confirmed cases to 16,201.
 31 May: The Ministry of Health announced that 637 new cases were confirmed in the last 24 hours, bringing the number of total confirmed cases to 16,838. 11 new deaths were reported, making the number of deaths rise to 539, and also 236 patients were discharged, bringing the total number of recoveries to 5,323.

June 2020
 1 June: 564 new cases and 17 new deaths were reported, bringing the total number of cases to 17,402 and the number of deaths to 556.
 2 June: The Ministry of Health confirmed 904 new cases and 13 new deaths; The number of confirmed cases has risen to 18,306 and the number of total deaths to 569, while the number of recoveries is now 5,696.
 3 June: There were 949 new confirmed cases, rising to a total of 19,255. 14 new deaths were also reported, bringing the number of deaths to 583.
 4 June: 929 new cases were confirmed, making the total number of cases rise to 20,184. The number of deaths reported during the day were 25, making the total number of deaths rise to 608. Also, 5,980 patients recovered from the virus through this day.
 5 June: On this day, 95 recoveries and 24 new deaths were confirmed, making the number of total of recoveries rise to 6,075 and the number of deaths to 632. Also, 840 new confirmed cases were confirmed, bringing the total number of confirmed cases up to 21,024.
 6 June: In the morning, the Ministry of Health confirmed a total of 92 new recoveries. In the night report, 16 deaths and 983 new cases were confirmed, bringing the total number of deaths to 648 and confirmed cases to 22,007.
 7 June: The number of confirmed cases rose to a total of 22,781 after 774 new cases were reported. 16 new deaths were also reported, bringing the number of deaths to 664.
 8 June: The Ministry of Health announced that 826 new cases were confirmed in the last 24 hours, bringing the number of total confirmed cases to 23,607. 29 new deaths were reported, making the number of deaths rise to 693, and also 396 patients were discharged, bringing the total number of recoveries to 7,292.
 9 June: 1,141 new cases and 24 new deaths were reported, bringing the total number of cases to 24,748 and the number of deaths to 717. The Government of the Province of Formosa reported the first case of COVID-19 in its province, leaving the province of Catamarca as the only province that did not report any cases yet.
 10 June: The Ministry of Health confirmed 1,226 new cases and 18 new deaths; The number of confirmed cases has risen to 25,974 and the number of total deaths to 735, while the number of recoveries is now 7,978.
 11 June: There were 1,386 new confirmed cases, rising to a total of 27,360. 30 new deaths were also reported, bringing the number of deaths to 765.
 12 June: Martín Insaurralde, the Mayor of Lomas de Zamora was diagnosed with COVID-19 and isolated. After having meetings with the mayor, the Ministry of Social Development was also tested. This led to the suspension of the previously planned president's visit to Catamarca, the only province that has not reported any cases to this date. Later, 1,391 new cases were confirmed, making the total number of cases rise to 28,751. The number of deaths reported during the day were 20, making the total number of deaths rise to 785. Also, 8,730 patients recovered from the virus through this day.
 13 June: On this day, 340 recoveries and 30 new deaths were confirmed, making the number of total of recoveries rise to 9,070 and the number of deaths to 815. Also, 1,531 new confirmed cases were confirmed, bringing the total number of confirmed cases up to 30,282.
 14 June: In the morning, the Ministry of Health confirmed a total of 481 new recoveries. In the nightly report, 18 deaths and 1,282 new cases were confirmed, bringing the total number of deaths to 833 and confirmed cases to 31,564.
 15 June: The number of confirmed cases rose to a total of 32,772 after 1,208 new cases were reported. 21 new deaths were also reported, bringing the number of deaths to 854.
 16 June: The Ministry of Health announced that 1,374 new cases were confirmed in the last 24 hours, bringing the number of total confirmed cases to 34,146. 24 new deaths were reported, making the number of deaths rise to 878, and also 283 patients were discharged, bringing the total number of recoveries to 10,161.
 17 June: 1,393 new cases and 35 new deaths were reported, bringing the total number of cases to 35,539 and the number of deaths to 913.
 18 June: The Ministry of Health confirmed 1,958 new cases and 35 new deaths; The number of confirmed cases has risen to 37,497 and the number of total deaths to 948, while the number of recoveries is now 10,708.
 19 June: There were 2,060 new confirmed cases, rising to a total of 39,557. 31 new deaths were also reported, bringing the number of deaths to 979.
 20 June: 1,634 new cases were confirmed, making the total number of cases rise to 41,191. The number of deaths reported during the day were 13, making the total number of deaths rise to 992. Also, 12,193 patients recovered from the virus through this day.
 21 June: On this day, 522 recoveries and 19 new deaths were confirmed, making the number of total of recoveries rise to 12,715 and the number of deaths to 1,011. Also, 1,581 new confirmed cases were confirmed, bringing the total number of confirmed cases up to 42,772.
 22 June: In the morning, the Ministry of Health confirmed a total of 425 new recoveries. In the nightly report, 32 deaths and 2,146 new cases were confirmed, bringing the total number of deaths to 1,043 and confirmed cases to 44,918.
 23 June: The number of confirmed cases continued to rise, reaching a total of 47,203 after 2,285 new cases were reported. 35 new deaths were also reported, bringing the number of deaths to 1,078.
 24 June: The Ministry of Health announced that 2,635 new cases were confirmed in the last 24 hours, bringing the number of total confirmed cases to 49,838. 38 new deaths were reported, making the number of deaths rise to 1,116, and also 240 patients were discharged, bringing the total number of recoveries to 13,803.
 25 June: 2,606 new cases and 34 new deaths were reported, bringing the total number of cases to 52,444 and the number of deaths to 1,150. It was also reported that there are 457 patients with confirmed diagnosis of COVID-19 in the intensive care unit (ICU) across the country, representing 4 percent of the total number of available ICU beds. Including also patients with suspected diagnosis of COVID-19 and other causes, it leads to an ICU bed occupation of 45.1% throughout the country.
 26 June: The Ministry of Health confirmed 2,886 new cases and 34 new deaths; The number of confirmed cases has risen to 55,330 and the number of total deaths to 1,184, while the number of recoveries is now 18,403.
 27 June: There were 2,401 new confirmed cases, rising to a total of 57,731. 23 new deaths were also reported, bringing the number of deaths to 1,207.
 28 June: 2,189 new cases were confirmed, making the total number of cases rise to 59,920. The number of deaths reported during the day were 26, making the total number of deaths rise to 1,232. Also, 20,121 patients recovered from the virus through this day.
 29 June: On this day, 1,004 recoveries and 48 new deaths were confirmed, making the number of total of recoveries rise to 21,125 and the number of deaths to 1,280. Also, 2,335 new confirmed cases were confirmed, bringing the total number of confirmed cases up to 62,255.
 30 June: In the morning, the Ministry of Health confirmed a total of 890 new recoveries. In the nightly report, 27 deaths and 2,262 new cases were confirmed, bringing the total number of deaths to 1,307 and confirmed cases to 64,517.

July 2020
 1 July: The number of confirmed cases continued to rise, reaching a total of 67,184 after 2,667 new cases were reported. 44 new deaths were also reported, bringing the number of deaths to 1,351.
 2 July: The Ministry of Health announced that 2,744 new cases were confirmed in the last 24 hours, bringing the number of total confirmed cases to 69,928. 34 new deaths were reported, making the number of deaths rise to 1,385, and also 1,146 patients were discharged, bringing the total number of recoveries to 24,173.
 3 July: The Governor of the Province of Catamarca confirmed its first case within the province. Catamarca was the last province to report its first case since the virus reached the country on 3 March. Later, 2,845 new cases and 52 new deaths were reported, bringing the total number of cases to 72,773 and the number of deaths to 1,437.
 4 July: The Ministry of Health confirmed 2,590 new cases and 44 new deaths; The number of confirmed cases has risen to 75,363 and the number of total deaths to 1,481, while the number of recoveries is now 25,917.
 5 July: There were 2,439 new confirmed cases, rising to a total of 77,802. 26 new deaths were also reported, bringing the number of deaths to 1,507.
 6 July: 2,632 new cases were confirmed, making the total number of cases rise to 80,434. The number of deaths reported during the day were 75, making the total number of deaths rise to 1,582. Also, 28,518 patients recovered from the virus through this day.
 7 July: On this day, 1,564 recoveries and 62 new deaths were confirmed, making the number of total of recoveries rise to 30,082 and the number of deaths to 1,644. Also, 2,979 new confirmed cases were confirmed, bringing the total number of confirmed cases up to 83,413.
 8 July: In the morning, the Ministry of Health confirmed a total of 6,407 new recoveries, and one death from the previous day was reclassified. In the nightly report, 51 deaths and 3,604 new cases were confirmed, bringing the total number of deaths to 1,694 and confirmed cases to 87,017.
 9 July: The number of confirmed cases continued to rise, reaching a total of 90,680 after 3,663 new cases were reported. 26 new deaths were also reported, bringing the number of deaths to 1,720.
 10 July: The Ministry of Health announced that 3,367 new cases were confirmed in the last 24 hours, bringing the number of total confirmed cases to 94,047. 54 new deaths were reported, making the number of deaths rise to 1,774, and also 671 patients were discharged, bringing the total number of recoveries to 38,971.
 11 July: 3,449 new cases and 36 new deaths were reported, bringing the total number of cases to 97,496 and the number of deaths to 1,810.
 12 July: The Ministry of Health confirmed 2,657 new cases and 35 new deaths; The number of confirmed cases has risen to 100,153 and the number of total deaths to 1,845, while the number of recoveries is now 42,681.
 13 July: There were 3,099 new confirmed cases, rising to a total of 103,252. 58 new deaths were also reported, bringing the number of deaths to 1,903.
 14 July:  3,645 new cases were confirmed, making the total number of cases rise to 106,897. The number of deaths reported during the day were 65, making the total number of deaths rise to 1,968. Also, 45,454 patients recovered from the virus through this day.
 15 July: On this day, 1,831 recoveries and 82 new deaths were confirmed, making the number of total of recoveries rise to 47,285 and the number of deaths to 2,050. The number of new confirmed cases confirmed were 4,250, bringing the total number of confirmed cases up to 111,147. Also, 95 percent of the new confirmed cases were reported from the City and Province of Buenos Aires and the Province of Chaco.
 16 July: In the morning, the Ministry of Health confirmed a total of 1,822 new recoveries. In the nightly report, 62 deaths and 3,624 new cases were confirmed, bringing the total number of deaths to 2,112 and confirmed cases to 114,770.
 17 July: At a press conference given by President Fernández, Governors Axel Kicillof (Province of Buenos Aires), Jorge Capitanich (Chaco), Gerardo Morales (Jujuy) and Arabela Carreras (Río Negro), and the Mayor of the City of Buenos Aires, Horacio Rodríguez Larreta, it was announced that the lockdown would be loosened in the coming weeks, in an attempt to return to normality. Later, the number of confirmed cases continued to rise, reaching a total of 119,288 after 4,518 new cases were reported. 66 new deaths were also reported, bringing the number of deaths to 2,178.
 18 July: The Ministry of Health announced that 3,223 new cases were confirmed in the last 24 hours, bringing the number of total confirmed cases to 122,511. 42 new deaths were reported, making the number of deaths rise to 2,220, and also 2,827 patients were discharged, bringing the total number of recoveries to 52,594.
 19 July: 4,231 new cases and 40 new deaths were reported, bringing the total number of cases to 126,742 and the number of deaths to 2,260.
 20 July: The Ministry of Health confirmed 113 new deaths; The number of confirmed cases has risen to 130,761 and the number of total deaths to 2,373, while the number of recoveries is now 55,900. The official report from the Ministry of Health reported a total of 4,019 new cases, from which only 3,937 correspond to confirmed cases on this day. The remaining 82 cases come from delayed confirmed cases from the Province of Córdoba that were not updated on the previous days.
 21 July: There were 5,344 new confirmed cases, rising to a total of 136,105. 117 new deaths were also reported, bringing the number of deaths to 2,490.
 22 July: 5,782 new cases were confirmed, making the total number of cases rise to 141,887. The number of deaths reported during the day were 98, making the total number of deaths rise to 2,588. Also, 60,518 patients recovered from the virus through this day.
 23 July: On this day, 2,284 recoveries and 114 new deaths were confirmed, making the number of total of recoveries rise to 62,802 and the number of deaths to 2,702. The number of new confirmed cases confirmed were 6,127, bringing the total number of confirmed cases up to 148,014.
 24 July: In the morning, the Ministry of Health confirmed a total of 2,632 new recoveries. In the nightly report, 105 deaths and 5,493 new cases were confirmed, bringing the total number of deaths to 2,807 and confirmed cases to 153,507.
 25 July: The number of confirmed cases continued to rise, reaching a total of 158,321 after 4,814 new cases were reported. 86 new deaths were also reported, bringing the number of deaths to 2,893.
 26 July: The Ministry of Health announced that 4,192 new cases were confirmed in the last 24 hours, bringing the number of total confirmed cases to 162,513. 46 new deaths were reported, making the number of deaths rise to 2,939, and also 2,496 patients were discharged, bringing the total number of recoveries to 70,505.
 27 July: 4,890 new cases and 120 new deaths were reported, bringing the total number of cases to 167,403 and the number of deaths to 3,059.
 28 July: The Ministry of Health confirmed 120 new deaths; The number of confirmed cases has risen to 173,342 and the number of total deaths to 3,179, while the number of recoveries is now 75,070.
 29 July: There were 5,641 new confirmed cases, rising to a total of 178,983. 109 new deaths were also reported, bringing the number of deaths to 3,288.
 30 July: 6,377 new cases were confirmed, making the total number of cases rise to 185,360. The number of deaths reported during the day were 153, making the total number of deaths rise to 3,441. Also, 80,583 patients recovered from the virus through this day.
 31 July: On this day, 3,184 recoveries and 102 new deaths were confirmed, making the number of total of recoveries rise to 83,767 and the number of deaths to 3,543. The number of new confirmed cases confirmed were 5,929, bringing the total number of confirmed cases up to 191,289. In a press conference during the afternoon, President Fernández announced that the lockdown's current restrictions would continue until 16 August as there were a record of cases and deaths in the past days due to the virus.

August 2020
 1 August: In the morning, the Ministry of Health confirmed a total of 2,719 new recoveries. In the nightly report, 53 deaths and 5,241 new cases were confirmed, bringing the total number of deaths to 3,596 and confirmed cases to 196,530.
 2 August: The number of confirmed cases continued to rise, reaching a total of 201,906 after 5,376 new cases were reported. 52 new deaths were also reported, bringing the number of deaths to 3,648. Also, the government decided to ban social gatherings across the country for 15 days amid surge of infections and fatalities.
 3 August: The Ministry of Health announced that 4,824 new cases were confirmed in the last 24 hours, bringing the number of total confirmed cases to 206,730. 165 new deaths were reported, making the number of deaths rise to 3,813, and also 2,276 patients were discharged, bringing the total number of recoveries to 91,289.
 4 August: 6,792 new cases and 166 new deaths were reported, bringing the total number of cases to 213,522 and the number of deaths to 3,979.
 5 August: The Ministry of Health confirmed 127 new deaths and 7,147 new cases; The number of confirmed cases has risen to 220,669 and the number of total deaths to 4,106, while the number of recoveries is now 96,935.
 6 August: There were 7,513 new confirmed cases, rising to a total of 228,182. 145 new deaths were also reported, bringing the number of deaths to 4,251.
 7 August: 7,482 new cases were confirmed, making the total number of cases rise to 235,664. The number of deaths reported during the day were 160, making the total number of deaths rise to 4,411. Also, 103,284 patients recovered from the virus through this day.
 8 August: On this day, 4,945 recoveries and 112 new deaths were confirmed, making the number of total of recoveries rise to 108,229 and the number of deaths to 4,523. The number of new confirmed cases confirmed were 6,134, bringing the total number of confirmed cases up to 241,798.
 9 August: In the morning, the Ministry of Health confirmed a total of 61,867 new recoveries. This big jump was due to a revision on the definition of a recovery, which now includes (among the discharged from the hospitals) mild cases in which the system will automatically discharge 10 days after the symptom onset date. This led to a recovery rate of 70% of confirmed COVID-19 cases through the date. In the nightly report, 83 deaths and 4,688 new cases were confirmed, bringing the total number of deaths to 4,606 and confirmed cases to 246,486.
 10 August: The number of confirmed cases continued to rise, reaching a total of 253,855 after 7,369 new cases were reported. 158 new deaths were also reported, bringing the number of deaths to 4,764. During this day, over 10,000 students in San Juan became the first to return to face-to-face classes through social distancing. Also, practices of the Men's First Division and Women's First Division of Argentine football started after health protocols were approved by the government.
 11 August: The Ministry of Health announced that 7,043 new cases were confirmed in the last 24 hours, bringing the number of total confirmed cases to 260,898. 240 new deaths were reported, making the number of deaths rise to 5,004, and also 6,415 patients were discharged, bringing the total number of recoveries to 181,376.
 12 August: 7,663 new cases and 209 new deaths were reported, bringing the total number of cases to 268,561 and the number of deaths to 5,213.
 13 August: The Ministry of Health confirmed 149 new deaths and 7,498 new cases; The number of confirmed cases has risen to 276,059 and the number of total deaths to 5,362, while the number of recoveries is now 192,421.
 14 August: After 147 days under the lockdown, it was extended for two more weeks until 30 August. Several cities from Jujuy, Salta, La Rioja and Santiago del Estero that experienced a big growth in the number of confirmed cases in the previous weeks were put back into a tighter lockdown, joining the cities that were still under lockdown from Greater Buenos Aires, Jujuy, Santa Cruz and Tierra del Fuego. In the night, it was confirmed that the Governor of Jujuy (Gerardo Morales) and the Security Minister from the Province of Buenos Aires (Sergio Berni) tested positive for COVID-19. They both described that were "asymptomatic" and also "complying with isolation and all medical recommendations". On this day, there were 6,365 new confirmed cases, rising to a total of 282,424. 165 new deaths were also reported, bringing the number of deaths to 5,527.
 15 August: 6,663 new cases were confirmed, making the total number of cases rise to 289,087. The number of deaths reported during the day were 110, making the total number of deaths rise to 5,637. Also, 205,684 patients recovered from the virus through this day.
 16 August: On this day, 6,005 recoveries and 66 new deaths were confirmed, making the number of total of recoveries rise to 211,689 and the number of deaths to 5,703. The number of new confirmed cases confirmed were 5,469, bringing the total number of confirmed cases up to 294,556.
 17 August: In the morning, the Ministry of Health confirmed a total of 6,148 new recoveries. In the nightly report, 111 deaths and 4,557 new cases were confirmed, bringing the total number of deaths to 5,814 and confirmed cases to 299,113.
 18 August: The number of confirmed cases continued to rise, reaching a total of 305,953 after 6,840 new cases were reported. 234 new deaths were also reported, bringing the number of deaths to 6,048.
 19 August: The Ministry of Health announced that 6,693 new cases were confirmed in the last 24 hours, bringing the number of total confirmed cases to 312,646. 282 new deaths were reported, making the number of deaths rise to 6,330, and also 5,194 patients were discharged, bringing the total number of recoveries to 228,712.
 20 August: 8,225 new cases and 187 new deaths were reported, bringing the total number of cases to 320,871 and the number of deaths to 6,517.
 21 August:  The Ministry of Health confirmed 213 new deaths and 8,159 new cases; The number of confirmed cases has risen to 329,030 and the number of total deaths to 6,730, while the number of recoveries is now 239,793.
 22 August: On this day, there were 7,759 new confirmed cases, rising to a total of 336,789. 118 new deaths were also reported, bringing the number of deaths to 6,848.
 23 August: 5,352 new cases were confirmed, making the total number of cases rise to 342,141. The number of deaths reported during the day were 137, making the total number of deaths rise to 6,985. Also, 251,387 patients recovered from the virus through this day.
 24 August: On this day, 5,389 recoveries and 381 new deaths were confirmed, making the number of total of recoveries rise to 256,776 and the number of deaths to 7,366. The number of new confirmed cases confirmed were 8,713, bringing the total number of confirmed cases up to 350,854.
 25 August:  In the morning, the Ministry of Health confirmed a total of 6,413 new recoveries. In the nightly report, 197 deaths and 8,771 new cases were confirmed, bringing the total number of deaths to 7,563 and confirmed cases to 359,625.
 26 August: The number of confirmed cases continued to rise, reaching a total of 370,175 after 10,550 new cases were reported. 276 new deaths were also reported, bringing the number of deaths to 7,839.
 27 August: Health Access Secretary, Carla Vizzotti, recommended people not to realize activities in closed places for a long period of time with people close and without face masks, that include intense actions such as laughing, screaming nor sing, coughing or sneezing without covering the mouth with the crook of the elbow, with other people since it's possible to infect someone that way. The Ministry of Health announced that 10,104 new cases were confirmed in the last 24 hours, bringing the number of total confirmed cases to 380,279. 211 new deaths were reported, making the number of deaths rise to 8,050, and also 5,657 patients were discharged, bringing the total number of recoveries to 274,445.
 28 August: President Fernández announced that meetings of up to ten people in the open air, maintaining two meters of distance and using a face mask were authorized throughout the country. It was also announced that the eased lockdown would be extended again until September 20. Later, 11,717 new cases and 221 new deaths were reported, bringing the total number of cases to 391,996 and the number of deaths to 8,271.
 29 August: The Ministry of Health confirmed 82 new deaths and 9,230 new cases; The number of confirmed cases has risen to 401,226 and the number of total deaths to 8,353, while the number of recoveries is now 287,207.
 30 August: On this day, there were 7,187 new confirmed cases, rising to a total of 408,413. 104 new deaths were also reported, bringing the number of deaths to 8,457.
 31 August: 9,309 new cases were confirmed, making the total number of cases rise to 417,722. The number of deaths reported during the day were 203, making the total number of deaths rise to 8,660. Also, 301,182 patients recovered from the virus through this day.

September 2020
 1 September: On this day, 7,681 recoveries and 259 new deaths were confirmed, making the number of total of recoveries rise to 308,863 and the number of deaths to 8,919. The number of new confirmed cases confirmed were 10,504, bringing the total number of confirmed cases up to 428,226.
 2 September: In the morning, the Ministry of Health confirmed a total of 6,654 new recoveries. In the nightly report, 199 deaths and 10,933 new cases were confirmed, bringing the total number of deaths to 9,118 and confirmed cases to 439,159.
 3 September: The number of confirmed cases continued to rise, reaching a total of 451,185 after 12,026 new cases were reported. 243 new deaths were also reported, bringing the number of deaths to 9,361.
 4 September: The Ministry of Health announced that 10,684 new cases were confirmed in the last 24 hours, bringing the number of total confirmed cases to 461,869. 262 new deaths were reported, making the number of deaths rise to 9,623, and also 9,160 patients were discharged, bringing the total number of recoveries to 331,608.
 5 September: 9,924 new cases and 116 new deaths were reported, bringing the total number of cases to 471,793 and the number of deaths to 9,739.
 6 September: The Ministry of Health confirmed 120 new deaths and 6,986 new cases; The number of confirmed cases has risen to 478,779 and the number of total deaths to 9,859, while the number of recoveries is now 349,119.
 7 September: On this day, there were 9,215 new confirmed cases, rising to a total of 487,994. 270 new deaths were also reported, bringing the number of deaths to 10,129.
 8 September: 12,027 new cases were confirmed, making the total number of cases rise to 500,021. The number of deaths reported during the day were 276, making the total number of deaths rise to 10,405. Also, 366,577 patients recovered from the virus through this day.
 9 September: On this day, 15,900 recoveries and 253 new deaths were confirmed, making the number of total of recoveries rise to 382,477 and the number of deaths to 10,658. The number of new confirmed cases confirmed were 12,259, bringing the total number of confirmed cases up to 512,280.
 10 September: In the morning, the Ministry of Health confirmed a total of 7,608 new recoveries. In the nightly report, 249 deaths and 11,905 new cases were confirmed, bringing the total number of deaths to 10,907 and confirmed cases to 524,185.
 11 September: The number of confirmed cases continued to rise, reaching a total of 535,692 after 11,507 new cases were reported. 241 new deaths were also reported, bringing the number of deaths to 11,148.
 12 September: The Ministry of Health announced that 10,776 new cases were confirmed in the last 24 hours, bringing the number of total confirmed cases to 546,468. 115 new deaths were reported, making the number of deaths rise to 11,263, and also 9,650 patients were discharged, bringing the total number of recoveries to 409,758.
 13 September: 9,056 new cases and 89 new deaths were reported, bringing the total number of cases to 555,524 and the number of deaths to 11,352.
 14 September: The Ministry of Health confirmed 315 new deaths and 9,909 new cases; The number of confirmed cases has risen to 565,433 and the number of total deaths to 11,667, while the number of recoveries is now 428,940.
 15 September: On this day, there were 11,892 new confirmed cases, rising to a total of 577,325. 185 new deaths were also reported, bringing the number of deaths to 11,852.
 16 September: 11,674 new cases were confirmed, making the total number of cases rise to 588,999. The number of deaths reported during the day were 264, making the total number of deaths rise to 12,116. Also, 448,250 patients recovered from the virus through this day.
 17 September: On this day, 8,084 recoveries and 344 new deaths were confirmed, making the number of total of recoveries rise to 456,334 and the number of deaths to 12,460. The number of new confirmed cases confirmed were 12,701, bringing the total number of confirmed cases up to 601,700.
 18 September:
 The Ministry of Health confirmed a total of 10,939 new recoveries. In the nightly report, 196 deaths and 11,945 new cases were confirmed, bringing the total number of deaths to 12,656 and confirmed cases to 613,645.
 Also, on this day President Fernández announced the extension of the lockdown until 11 October, with local authorities still in charge of applying new restrictions in each territory.
 19 September: The number of confirmed cases continued to rise, reaching a total of 622,921 after 9,276 new cases were reported. 143 new deaths were also reported, bringing the number of deaths to 12,799.
 20 September: The Ministry of Health announced that 8,431 new cases were confirmed in the last 24 hours, bringing the number of total confirmed cases to 631,352. 254 new deaths were reported, making the number of deaths rise to 13,053, and also 10,154 patients were discharged, bringing the total number of recoveries to 488,218.
 21 September: 8,782 new cases and 429 new deaths were reported, bringing the total number of cases to 640,134 and the number of deaths to 13,482.
 22 September: The Ministry of Health confirmed 470 new deaths and 12,027 new cases; The number of confirmed cases has risen to 652,161 and the number of total deaths to 13,952, while the number of recoveries is now 517,215.
 23 September: On this day, there were 12,625 new confirmed cases, rising to a total of 664,786. 424 new deaths were also reported, bringing the number of deaths to 14,376.
 24 September: 13,467 new cases were confirmed, making the total number of cases rise to 678,253. The number of deaths reported during the day were 390, making the total number of deaths rise to 14,766. Also, 536,576 patients recovered from the virus through this day.
 25 September:
 On this day, 10,335 recoveries and 442 new deaths were confirmed, making the number of total of recoveries rise to 546,911 and the number of deaths to 15,208. The number of new confirmed cases confirmed were 12,969, bringing the total number of confirmed cases up to 691,222.
 The Minister of Social Development, Daniel Arroyo, tested positive for COVID-19. and the Minister of Health of the Province of Santa Fe was hospitalized in Rosario after testing positive for COVID-19 due to a worsening of her symptoms.
 The Ministry of Health of the Province of Buenos Aires reported an extra 3,699 deaths missed in previous reports due to a modification on the data entry system. This modification was expected to avoid future under-reporting and data criticism. The number of deaths from the Province of Buenos Aires rose from 8,867 to 12,566 (excluding confirmed deaths from 25 September).
 26 September: The Ministry of Health confirmed a total of 9,565 new recoveries. In the nightly report, 335 deaths and 11,249 new cases were confirmed, bringing the total number of deaths to 15,543 and confirmed cases to 702,471.
 27 September: The number of confirmed cases continued to rise, reaching a total of 711,312 after 8,841 new cases were reported. 206 new deaths were also reported, bringing the number of deaths to 15,749.
 28 September: The Ministry of Health announced that 11,807 new cases were confirmed in the last 24 hours, bringing the number of total confirmed cases to 723,119. 364 new deaths were reported, making the number of deaths rise to 16,113, and also 10,780 patients were discharged, bringing the total number of recoveries to 576,702.
 29 September: 13,477 new cases and 406 new deaths were reported, bringing the total number of cases to 736,596 and the number of deaths to 16,519.
 30 September: The Ministry of Health confirmed 418 new deaths and 14,392 new cases; The number of confirmed cases has risen to 750,988 and the number of total deaths to 16,937, while the number of recoveries is now 594,632.

October 2020
 1 October: On this day, there were 14,001 new confirmed cases, rising to a total of 764,989. 3,351 new deaths were also reported, bringing the number of deaths to 20,288. 3,050 deaths correspond to the missed ones in previous reports from the Province of Buenos Aires after the modification on their data entry system.
 2 October:
 The governor of the province of Buenos Aires, Axel Kicillof, isolated with his family after having contact with a government worker that tested positive for COVID-19. It was decided that the governor would be tested in a few days in order to prevent a false negative result from the test.
 14,687 new cases were confirmed, making the total number of cases rise to 779,676. The number of deaths reported during the day were 311, making the total number of deaths rise to 20,599. Also, 614,502 patients recovered from the virus through this day.
 3 October: On this day, 11,599 recoveries and 196 new deaths were confirmed, making the number of total of recoveries rise to 626,101 and the number of deaths to 20,795. The number of new confirmed cases confirmed were 11,129, bringing the total number of confirmed cases up to 790,805.
 4 October: The Ministry of Health confirmed a total of 10,558 new recoveries. In the nightly report, 223 deaths and 7,668 new cases were confirmed, bringing the total number of deaths to 21,018 and confirmed cases to 798,473.
 5 October: The number of confirmed cases continued to rise, reaching a total of 809,715 after 11,242 new cases were reported. 450 new deaths were also reported, bringing the number of deaths to 21,468.
 6 October: The Ministry of Health announced that 14,740 new cases were confirmed in the last 24 hours, bringing the number of total confirmed cases to 824,455. 359 new deaths were reported, making the number of deaths rise to 21,827, and also 11,255 patients were discharged, bringing the total number of recoveries to 660,259.
 7 October: 16,447 new cases and 399 new deaths were reported, bringing the total number of cases to 840,902 and the number of deaths to 22,226.
 8 October: The Ministry of Health confirmed 484 new deaths and 15,454 new cases; The number of confirmed cases has risen to 856,356 and the number of total deaths to 22,710, while the number of recoveries is now 684,831.
 9 October:
 President Fernández announced that due to the epidemiological situation in the previous weeks, the lockdown would continue in Argentina until 25 October with new measures in order to decrease circulation in 18 provinces.
 On this day, there were 15,099 new confirmed cases, rising to a total of 871,455. 515 new deaths were also reported, bringing the number of deaths to 23,225.
 10 October: 12,414 new cases were confirmed, making the total number of cases rise to 883,869. The number of deaths reported during the day were 356, making the total number of deaths rise to 23,581. Also, 709,451 patients recovered from the virus through this day.
 11 October: On this day, 11,916 recoveries and 287 new deaths were confirmed, making the number of total of recoveries rise to 721,367 and the number of deaths to 23,868. The number of new confirmed cases confirmed were 10,324, bringing the total number of confirmed cases up to 891,193.
 12 October: The Ministry of Health confirmed a total of 11,202 new recoveries. In the nightly report, 318 deaths and 9,524 new cases were confirmed, bringing the total number of deaths to 24,186 and confirmed cases to 903,717.
 13 October: The number of confirmed cases continued to rise, reaching a total of 917,022 after 13,305 new cases were reported. 386 new deaths were also reported, bringing the number of deaths to 24,572.
 14 October: The Ministry of Health announced that 14,932 new cases were confirmed in the last 24 hours, bringing the number of total confirmed cases to 931,954. 349 new deaths were reported, making the number of deaths rise to 24,921, and also 8,911 patients were discharged, bringing the total number of recoveries to 751,133.
 15 October: 17,096 new cases and 421 new deaths were reported, bringing the total number of cases to 949,050 and the number of deaths to 25,342.
 16 October: The Ministry of Health confirmed 381 new deaths and 16,546 new cases; The number of confirmed cases has risen to 965,596 and the number of total deaths to 25,723, while the number of recoveries is now 778,488.
 17 October: On this day, there were 13,510 new confirmed cases, rising to a total of 979,106. 384 new deaths were also reported, bringing the number of deaths to 26,107.
 18 October: 10,561 new cases were confirmed, making the total number of cases rise to 989,667. The number of deaths reported during the day were 160, making the total number of deaths rise to 26,267. Also, 803,952 patients recovered from the virus through this day.
 19 October: On this day, 449 new deaths were confirmed, making the total number of deaths rise to 26,716. The number of new confirmed cases confirmed were 12,982, bringing the total number of confirmed cases up to 1,002,649.
 20 October: The Ministry of Health confirmed a total of 25,682 new recoveries. In the nightly report, 384 deaths and 16,337 new cases were confirmed, bringing the total number of deaths to 27,100 and confirmed cases to 1,018,986.
 21 October: The number of confirmed cases continued to rise, reaching a total of 1,037,312 after 18,326 new cases were reported. 419 new deaths and 10,873 new recoveries were also reported, bringing the number of deaths to 27,519 and recoveries to 840,507.
 22 October: The Ministry of Health announced that 16,325 new cases were confirmed in the last 24 hours, bringing the number of total confirmed cases to 1,053,637. 438 new deaths were reported, making the number of deaths rise to 27,957, and also 11,334 patients were discharged, bringing the total number of recoveries to 851,841.
 23 October:
 It was announced that the lockdown would continue for another two weeks in the provinces of Chubut, Córdoba, Mendoza, Neuquén, Río Negro, San Luis, Santa Fe and Tucumán, and in Greater Buenos Aires, as these provinces have been accounting for 55 percent of the country's total cases in the previous weeks.
 15,718 new cases and 381 new deaths were reported, bringing the total number of cases to 1,069,355 and the number of deaths to 28,338.
 24 October: The Ministry of Health confirmed 275 new deaths and 11,968 new cases; The number of confirmed cases has risen to 1,081,323 and the number of total deaths to 28,613, while the number of recoveries is now 881,100.
 25 October: On this day, there were 9,253 new confirmed cases, rising to a total of 1,090,576. 283 new deaths were also reported, bringing the number of deaths to 28,896.
 26 October: 11,712 new cases were confirmed, making the total number of cases rise to 1,102,288. The number of deaths reported during the day were 405, making the total number of deaths rise to 29,301. Also, 909,573 patients recovered from the virus through this day.
 27 October: On this day, 11,758 recoveries and 429 new deaths were confirmed, making the number of total of recoveries rise to 921,331 and the number of deaths to 29,730. The number of new confirmed cases confirmed were 14,308, bringing the total number of confirmed cases up to 1,116,596.
 28 October: The Ministry of Health confirmed a total of 9,803 new recoveries. In the nightly report, 341 deaths and 13,924 new cases were confirmed, bringing the total number of deaths to 30,071 and confirmed cases to 1,130,520.
 29 October: The number of confirmed cases continued to rise, reaching a total of 1,143,787 after 13,267 new cases were reported. 371 new deaths and 14,987 new recoveries were also reported, bringing the number of deaths to 30,442 and recoveries to 946,121.
 30 October: The Ministry of Health announced that 13,379 new cases were confirmed in the last 24 hours, bringing the number of total confirmed cases to 1,157,166. 350 new deaths were reported, making the number of deaths rise to 30,792, and also 14,967 patients were discharged, bringing the total number of recoveries to 961,088.
 31 October: 9,745 new cases and 210 new deaths were reported, bringing the total number of cases to 1,166,911 and the number of deaths to 31,002.

November 2020
 1 November: The Ministry of Health confirmed 138 new deaths and 6,609 new cases; The number of confirmed cases has risen to 1,173,520 and the number of total deaths to 31,140, while the number of recoveries is now 985,303.
 2 November:
 The government announced that would acquire during December 2020 and January 2021, 25 million of doses from the Russian vaccine Sputnik V after it would enter phase III.
 On this day, there were 9,598 new confirmed cases, rising to a total of 1,183,118. 483 new deaths were also reported, bringing the number of deaths to 31,623.
 3 November: 12,145 new cases were confirmed, making the total number of cases rise to 1,195,263. The number of deaths reported during the day were 429, making the total number of deaths rise to 32,052. Also, 1,009,265 patients recovered from the virus through this day.
 4 November: On this day, 8,369 recoveries and 468 new deaths were confirmed, making the number of total of recoveries rise to 1,017,634 and the number of deaths to 32,520. The number of new confirmed cases confirmed were 10,652, bringing the total number of confirmed cases up to 1,205,915.
 5 November: The Ministry of Health confirmed a total of 12,490 new recoveries. In the nightly report, 246 deaths and 11,100 new cases were confirmed, bringing the total number of deaths to 32,766 and confirmed cases to 1,217,015.
 6 November:
 The president announced that the lockdown would come to an end in Greater Buenos Aires in order to move to the social distancing phase after more than seven months.
 Vaccines such as the developed by University of Oxford and AstraZeneca, Pfizer, and China were also announced to be acquired eventually, after the Sputnik V was announced to be acquired four days ago.
 The number of confirmed cases reached a total of 1,228,801 after 11,786 new cases were reported. 370 new deaths and 12,100 new recoveries were also reported, bringing the number of deaths to 33,136 and recoveries to 1,042,224.
 7 November: The Ministry of Health announced that 8,037 new cases were confirmed in the last 24 hours, bringing the number of total confirmed cases to 1,236,838. 212 new deaths were reported, making the number of deaths rise to 33,348, and also 11,076 patients were discharged, bringing the total number of recoveries to 1,053,300.
 8 November: 5,331 new cases and 212 new deaths were reported, bringing the total number of cases to 1,242,169 and the number of deaths to 33,560.
 9 November: The Ministry of Health confirmed 347 new deaths and 8,317 new cases; The number of confirmed cases has risen to 1,250,486 and the number of total deaths to 33,907, while the number of recoveries is now 1,073,564.
 10 November: On this day, there were 11,977 new confirmed cases, rising to a total of 1,262,463. 276 new deaths were also reported, bringing the number of deaths to 34,183.
 11 November:
 10,880 new cases were confirmed, making the total number of cases rise to 1,273,343. The number of deaths reported during the day were 348, making the total number of deaths rise to 34,531. Also, 1,089,516 patients recovered from the virus through this day.
 President Fernández tested negative for COVID-19 after the Secretary for Strategic Affairs of the Presidency, Gustavo Béliz, tested positive. The president had close contact with the secretary, so the president isolated himself. Other ministers and secretaries also had to be isolated preventively.
 30 November: The Ministry of Health confirmed a total of 7,384 new recoveries. In the nightly report, 257 deaths and 5,724 new cases were confirmed, bringing the total number of deaths to 38,730 and confirmed cases to 1,424,518.

December 2020
 12 December: President Fernández announced the purchase of 10 million COVID-19 Sputnik V vaccines.
 22 December: The flight that brought the first 300,000 doses of the Sputnik V vaccine left for Moscow.
 24 December: The plane with the purchased 300,000 doses of the Sputnik V vaccine arrived in the country.
 29 December: The COVID-19 vaccination campaign begins across the country. Province of Buenos Aires' governor Kicillof was among the first to receive the vaccine.
 30 December:
 The AZD1222 vaccine (developed by Oxford University and AstraZeneca) was approved in the country.
 On this day, 5,791 recoveries and 145 new deaths were confirmed, making the number of total of recoveries rise to 1,426,659 and the number of deaths to 43,163. The number of new confirmed cases confirmed were 11,765, bringing the total number of confirmed cases up to 1,613,911.

January 2021
 6 January: City of Buenos Aires' Chief of Government, Horacio Rodríguez Larreta, tested positive for COVID-19.
 8 January: The government announced that would implement an immediate national night-time curfew after a jump in the number of infections in the previous weeks. It would run daily from 1–6 a.m., and intended to reduce the viral circulation.
 16 January: A first case from the newly-known lineage B.1.1.7 of the virus was confirmed. The variant became known for showing evidence of increased transmissibility.

Notes

References 

COVID-19 pandemic in Argentina
2020 in Argentina
Argentina
COVID-19